Charlie Chan in Egypt is the eighth of 16 20th Century Fox Charlie Chan films starring Warner Oland in the title role. It was released in 1935.

Plot
Charlie Chan is brought in when an archaeologist disappears while excavating ancient art treasures in Egypt. Charlie must sort out the stories of the archaeological team, deal with the crazed son of the missing scientist, learn why priceless treasures are falling into the hands of private collectors, and battle many seemingly supernatural events.

Cast
 Warner Oland as Charlie Chan
 Pat Paterson as Carol Arnold, whose father has disappeared, and is engaged to Tom Evans
 Thomas Beck as Tom Evans, an archaeologist assisting Professor Arnold at the Pyramids
 Rita Hayworth as Nayda (billed as Rita Cansino)
 Jameson Thomas as  Dr. Anton Racine
 Frank Conroy as Professor John Thurston, Carol and Barry's uncle
 Nigel De Brulier as Edfu Ahmed, the Arnold family's servant
 James Eagles as Barry Arnold, Carol's brother
 George Erving as Professor Arnold, leader of the expedition to the Pyramids
 Stepin Fetchit as Snowshoes, assistant on the expedition

External links
 
 
 
 

1935 films
Charlie Chan films
American black-and-white films
Films directed by Louis King
1935 mystery films
American mystery films
Fox Film films
Films scored by Samuel Kaylin
1930s English-language films
1930s American films